Chikkadpally is a locality in the city of Hyderabad, India.

Chikkadpally is surrounded by Musheerabad, Ashok Nagar, Narayanguda and Bagh Lingampally.

History
According to locals, Chikkadpally derives its name from chikkad, meaning mud. And -pally (originally palle, పల్లె in Telugu) means place or hamlet. Since Chikkadpally is in a low-lying area, it is usually plagued by chikkad due to inflow of drain water.
According to some other locals, Chikkadpally derives its name from cheekatipally (place/hamlet of shadows).

Transport
TSRTC buses connect all major parts of the city, Chikkadpally included. The closest MMTS Train station is at Vidyanagar or Jamia Osmania. Secunderabad Railway Station is 6 kilometres away and the Rajiv Gandhi International Airport is 25 kilometres away.

The Hyderabad Metro now runs through the area, with two stations in proximity.

Culture
The City Central Library is located here. The devotional singer M.S.Ramarao lived here, and a street bears his name in his honour -- Sundara Kanda M.S. Ramarao Lane.

A well-known Cultural Auditorium, Thyaagaraaya Gaanasabha, is located here, and sees many cultural activities and meetings.

The historic Lord Venkateshwara Temple, located here, is one of the oldest and most important landmarks of Chikkadpally.

Several popular cinemas are scattered around the general Chikkadpally and surrounding area, and screen predominantly Telugu (Tollywood) movies.

Gallery

References

Neighbourhoods in Hyderabad, India